James Hickman (born 1976) is a British swimmer.

James or Jim Hickman may also refer to:
James C. Hickman (1927–2006), American actuary
Jim Hickman (1910s outfielder) (1892–1958), American professional baseball player
Jim Hickman (1960s outfielder) (1937–2016), American professional baseball player
Jim Hickman (racing driver) (1943–1982), American racecar driver